Yujiulü Tiefa (r. 552–553) was the successor to Yujiulü Anagui in the eastern part of Rouran. He was proclaimed khagan by remnants of Rouran in 552. But he ruled only briefly until his death at the hands of Khitans in February 553. He was succeeded by his father Yujiulü Dengzhu, who at first fled to Northern Qi following demise of Yujiulü Anagui. This was only case in Rouran history that a father succeeded his son on the throne.

References 

Khagans of the Rouran
553 deaths